Hans Fidesser (12 March 1899 – 22 January 1982) was an Austrian singer and film actor.

Selected filmography
 The Flower of Hawaii (1933)
 Everything for Gloria (1941)
 The Wedding Hotel (1944)
 In the Temple of Venus (1948)
 Father Is Being Stupid (1953)

References

Bibliography
 Goble, Alan. The Complete Index to Literary Sources in Film. Walter de Gruyter, 1999.

External links

1899 births
1982 deaths
Austrian male film actors
20th-century Austrian male singers
Male actors from Vienna
Musicians from Vienna